Melisa Aslı Pamuk (born 14 April 1991) is a Turkish actress, model and beauty pageant titleholder born in the Netherlands. Her family is from İskenderun, Hatay, Turkey. She won the title of Miss Turkey 2011 on 2 June 2011. Pamuk accepted the crown from Gizem Memiç, Miss Turkey 2010 beauty pageant titleholder. She enrolled on a Psychology degree at University of Amsterdam but abandoned it later due to her desire to focus on her modeling career. She also won the title of "Best Promising" in Best Model of Turkey 2009 and stands 1.76 m. She is fluent in Turkish, English, Dutch and German and speaks a bit of French. She began modeling at the age of 14.

She became the lead character Hayal in the short movie Dat zit wel snor in 2004 which was a joint production of Bos Bros. Film & TV Productions and Interkerkelijke Omroep Nederland (IKON). She started her acting career when she was 13 years old and she started her model career when she was 14 years old. She became Best Promising Model (Umut/Gelecek Vaat Eden Model) in 2009 Best Model of Turkey competition. She became a Miss Turkey in 2011. She represented Turkey in 2011 Miss Universe competition in Sao Paulo, Brazil. In order to improve her acting skills, She took acting lessons at Sadri Alisik Culture Center. She made her debut with her role in popular Turkish drama Love in the Sky (Yer Gok￼ 

Turkey beauty Melisa Asli Pamuk is attractive with her astounding height, fitted figure and pretty face.            

He made his debut in the movie Parachute. After that, she played the role of Hilda in the movie Linda, Hilda, Survivors of the Strawberry Age. He became famous in this blockbuster movie. Melissa also starred in the British-Dutch series Summer Style. He also had a cameo in the blockbuster Bahamas to the Moon. He started acting in Turkey in 2012 in Shamim Eshgh series. He has also acted in the Turkish series of Kurt Saeed and Shura and Eshke Bipayan. In her latest interview, Melissa said that she spends her free time with sports training, photography and cooking, and suggested these activities to all girls and young women. He said that he is fascinated by cooking, especially East and South Asian cuisine.                                                             

native of istanbul, melisa competed in the miss turkey held in the tim show centre in istanbul on june 2, 2011 and won the title of miss turkey 2011. as the official representative of her country, she competed in miss universe 2011 in brazil but unplaced.

This beautiful Turkish actress has started modeling since she was 14 years old, and after starting psychology at the University of Amsterdam in the Netherlands, she left the university due to participating in the Miss Turkey competitionments	31-25-33 inchesligion Turkey 2011 
A native of Istanbul, Melisa competed in Miss Turkey held in the TIM Show Centre in Istanbul on June 2, 2011 and won the title of Miss Turkey 2011.Since he was a teenager, he participated in two national competitions and has many honors and awards in this sport

Biography of actress Melissa Asli Pamuk

Biography of Melisa Aslı Pamuk (Melisa Aslı Pamuk), Turkish actress

education

He received his degree in photography in Scotland, and some time later, surprisingly, he realized his talent in the art of acting and studied acting professionally at the Amsterdam College of Culture and Drama.

Miss Universe 2011 
As the official representative of her country, she competed in Miss Universe 2011 in Brazil but Unplaced.

About 
Dutch-Turkish beauty queen and actress known for being Miss Turkey 2011 and representing her country at the 2011 Miss Universe pageant. She's also appeared in films in Turkey and the Netherlands.

Before Fame 
She embarked on her modeling career when she was 14 years old and competed in Best Model of Turkey in 2009.  

This beautiful Turkish actress has started modeling since she was 14 years old, and after starting psychology at the University of Amsterdam in the Netherlands, she left the university due to participating in the Miss Turkey competition. 

In 2011, when Melissa traveled to Istanbul for vacation, she tried her luck to participate in the Miss Turkey pageant and became the first runner-up.

In the same year, she represented Turkey in the Miss World competition held in Sao Paulo, Brazil, but she could not win a title in this competition.

In 2009, Melissa also won the title of promising model of the future in the competition of the best model of Turkey.

Trivia 
She studied psychology at the University of Amsterdam, but was unable to finish due to modeling commitments. She has more than 4.8 million followers on Instagram.

Family Life 
Although born in the Netherlands, she also speaks Turkish, as well as English and German.

Associated With 
Leila Lopes was crowned Miss Universe in 2011

Filmography

Film

Television

References

External links
 
 Caner Sipahi Casting Agency - Melisa Pamuk Profile 
 Melisa Pamuk at RareFilmFinder 
 Melisa Pamuk at LostMoviesArchive 

1991 births
Living people
Dutch people of Turkish descent
Dutch female models
Turkish female models
Turkish film actresses
Turkish television actresses
Dutch film actresses
University of Amsterdam alumni
Miss Universe 2011 contestants
Miss Turkey winners
People from Haarlem
Models from Istanbul
Actresses from Istanbul